Araz Abdullayev
 Araz Budagov
 Araz Musayev

Azerbaijani masculine given names